Pinal may refer to:

People
Pinal or Pinaleño, a band of the Native American Apache tribe
Silvia Pinal (born 1931), Mexican actress
Pinal Shah (born 1987), Indian World Cup wicket-keeper

Places
Pinal County, Arizona, United States
Pinal Airpark, huge aircraft boneyard near Marana
Pinal City, Arizona, ghost town in Pinal County
Pinal, Arizona, census-designated place in Gila County
Pinal de Amoles, Querétaro, Mexico
El Piñal, former Spanish port in Guangdong, China